Groove Funk Soul was the second album led by American jazz pianist Joe Castro which was released on the Atlantic label in 1960.

Reception

Allmusic gave the album 3 stars.

Track listing 
 "Groove Funk Soul" (Joe Castro) - 5:38
 "Yesterdays" (Jerome Kern, Otto Harbach) - 7:19
 "Day Dream" (Billy Strayhorn, Duke Ellington, John La Touche) - 6:59
 "It Could Happen To You" (Jimmy Van Heusen, Johnny Burke) - 3:31
 "Play Me the Blues" (Teddy Edwards) - 9:17
 "That's All" (Alan Brandt, Bob Haymes) - 5:12

Personnel 
Joe Castro - piano
Teddy Edwards - tenor saxophone (tracks 1-5)
Leroy Vinnegar - bass (tracks 1-5)
Billy Higgins - drums (tracks 1-5)

References 

Joe Castro albums
1960 albums
Atlantic Records albums
Instrumental albums